The 2014–15 LNH Division 1 is the 63rd season of the LNH Division 1, France's premier Handball league.

Team information 

The following 14 clubs compete in the LNH Division 1 during the 2014–15 season:

Personnel and kits
Following is the list of clubs competing in 2014–15 LNH Division 1, with their president, head coach, kit manufacturer and shirt sponsor.

League table 

Pld - Played; W - Won; D - Drawn; L - Lost; GF - Goals for; GA - Goals against; Diff - Difference; Pts - Points.
(C) = Champion; (R) = Relegated; (P) = Promoted; (E) = Eliminated; (O) = Play-off winner; (A) = Advances to a further round.

Schedule and results
In the table below the home teams are listed on the left and the away teams along the top.

Number of teams by regions

References

External links
 Official site 

2014–15 domestic handball leagues
LNH Division 1
LNH Division 1